Ali Eroğlu (born 2 November 1964) is a Turkish weightlifter. He competed in the men's light heavyweight event at the 1988 Summer Olympics.

References

1964 births
Living people
Turkish male weightlifters
Olympic weightlifters of Turkey
Weightlifters at the 1988 Summer Olympics
Place of birth missing (living people)
20th-century Turkish people